Lofty's Roach Soufflé is  an instrumental album by American artist Harry Connick Jr., released in 1990.

Presented as the Harry Connick Jr. Trio: 

 Harry Connick Jr. (piano)
 Benjamin Jonah Wolfe (bass)
 Shannon Powell (drums)

The album was released simultaneously as his big band album We Are in Love, and his home video debut entitled "Singin' & Swingin'".

Track listing
"One Last Pitch" (Harry Connick Jr., Joe Livingston)  – 6:27
"Hudson Bommer" (Connick)  – 5:13
"Lonely Side" (Connick)  – 8:15
"Mr. Spill" (Connick)  – 5:00
"Lofty's Roach Soufflé" (Connick)  – 5:23
"Mary Ruth" (Connick)  – 5:54
"Harronymous" (Connick)  – 5:22
"One Last Pitch (Take Two)" (Connick, Livingston)  – 3:26
"Colomby Day" (Connick)  – 6:06
"Little Dancing Girl" (Connick)  – 7:33
"Bayou Maharajah" (Connick)  – 4:41

Story of the album
Lofty's Roach Souffle was inspired by Connick's experiences on the film Memphis Belle: "In case you're curious about the title 'Lofty's Roach Souffle', last summer I was in England filming Memphis Belle, which is a World War II movie about a B-17. The actors were sent to boot camp at an SAS training ground where we met Lofty. Lofty was introduced to us as the premier survivalist in the world and he showed us one survival tip after another. D. B. Sweeney, who played the navigator in the movie, and I became friends during the shoot. D.B. also happens to be a fine chef, and he quickly noticed that Lofty could make food out of almost anything. Lofty was the master of outdoor cuisine! D.B. figured that Lofty might even be able to make roach souffle. I wrote a song to remind me of this experience."

Charts
Top Jazz Albums: #4
The Billboard 200: #94

Awards and nominations
1990 Grammy nomination: Best Instrumental Composition, "One Last Pitch (Take 2)" – Harry Connick Jr. & Joe Livingston

External links

Music video
"One Last Pitch", music video at aol.com

1990 albums
Harry Connick Jr. albums
Instrumental albums
Columbia Records albums